Roudno is a municipality and village in Bruntál District in the Moravian-Silesian Region of the Czech Republic. It has about 200 inhabitants. It lies on the shore of Slezská Harta Reservoir.

Administrative parts
The hamlet of Volárna is an administrative part of Roudno.

References

Villages in Bruntál District